Boonmee Boonrod ( born October 10, 1982), simply known as Mee is a Thai professional footballer who plays as a left back  for Lamphun Warrior.

Club career

References

External links

 Profile at Goal

1982 births
Living people
Boonmee Boonrod
Boonmee Boonrod
Association football fullbacks
Boonmee Boonrod
Boonmee Boonrod
Boonmee Boonrod